The Pakistan Badminton Federation (PBF) is the governing body for the sport of badminton in Pakistan. It was formed in 1953 to promote badminton in country. Nawab Iftikhar Mamdot became the first President and Sultan F. Hussain was the first Secretary General of the Federation.

In April 2011, the Badminton World Federation barred the PBF from participating in its international events due to the existence of two factions within the governing body. BWF was also "concerned about the PBF’s involvement in human trafficking and bogus entries in international events." In 2014, BWF lifted a ban from PBF, and in June 2014, PBF elected the new national badminton body.

Wajid Ali Chaudry is the current President, while Raja Azhar Mahmood is the current secretary of the PBF. The election was held on 4th December 2021 at Olympic House, Hameed Nizami Road, Lahore.

Affiliations 
The PBF is affiliated with:
Badminton World Federation
Badminton Asia Confederation
 Pakistan Sports Board
 Pakistan Olympic Association

Tournaments 
 Pakistan International
 Pakistan National Badminton Championships
 Pakistan Junior National Badminton Championships

External links
 Official Website

References

National members of the Badminton World Federation
Sports governing bodies in Pakistan
Badminton in Pakistan
Sports organizations established in 1953
1953 establishments in Pakistan